Carro Pass is a gently sloping snow pass linking Holluschickie Bay and the bay between Rink Point and Stoneley Point on the northwest coast of James Ross Island. It was named for Capitan Ignacio Carro of the Argentine Army, who first traversed the pass in 1959.

References
 

Mountain passes of Graham Land
Landforms of James Ross Island